Eduard Freudenheim was a male Austrian international table tennis player.

Table tennis career
He won a bronze medal at the 1926 World Table Tennis Championships in the mixed doubles with Gertrude Wildam  and a silver medal in the team event.

Freudenheim was a member of the Vienna Association Vienna Athletic Club. He became national Austrian champion in singles in 1925 and 1926. In 1928 he relocated to Poland for two years for professional reasons.

See also
 List of table tennis players
 List of World Table Tennis Championships medalists

References

Austrian male table tennis players
World Table Tennis Championships medalists